Archduke Leopold Wilhelm and the artist in the archducal picture gallery in Brussels is a 1653 painting of Archduke Leopold Wilhelm's Italian art collection by the Flemish Baroque painter David Teniers the Younger. It is now held in a private collection, but it was previously owned by the Rothschild family, from whom it was taken in World War II and placed in the Kunsthistorisches Museum where it stayed for 50 years until restitution in 1999.

The painting shows the Archduke as a collector with friends admiring a set of paintings. The artist himself holds his hat in his hand and is listening to his patron as the archduke gestures with his cane towards some recent acquisitions. The paintings are arranged in rows on the walls of an L-shaped room, with the men standing in front of a doorway with the words "TIMORE DOMINI" below a sculpted portrait of the archduke. Another set of paintings is positioned in the foreground leaning against chairs for inspection.

This painting is dated 1653 and was painted after earlier, larger versions that David Teniers the Younger prepared to document the Archduke's collection before he employed 12 engravers to publish his Theatrum Pictorium, considered the "first illustrated art catalog". He published this book of engravings after the Archduke had moved to Austria and taken his collection with him. It was published in Antwerp in 1659 and again in 1673. The most impressive of these gallery paintings was the large version on copper in the Museo del Prado with a different selection of paintings. That was produced as a gift from the archduke to  Philip IV of Spain.

Paintings depicted
Many of the recognizable paintings in the collection, not all of which were included in the Italian catalog prepared by Teniers, are still in the Viennese collection. This copy was probably produced in tandem with a similar version in the Museo Lázaro Galdiano as a gift.

Provenance
This painting was one of those forcibly "donated" by Baron Alphonse de Rothschild in 1938 and it was meant for the Führermuseum, looted by the Nazis following the Austrian Anschluss with Germany in 1938. The looted painting was stored with many other Rothschild treasures in the Austrian salt mines of Altaussee where they were discovered by the Allies after the war and returned to the Austrian government. Despite many efforts by Alphonse and his heirs, only granddaughter Bettina Burr was able to achieve restitution. This painting was finally paid for in 1999 after 50 years of "ownership" with a credit line of "donated by Clarice Rothschild in memory of her husband".

References 

 Die Rothschild'schen Gemäldesammlungen in Wien on OAPEN Foundation
 David Teniers and the Theatre of Painting, exhibition 19 October 2006 to 21 January 2007 on website of the Courtauld Institute of Art

1650s paintings
17th-century paintings
Paintings in the collection of the Archduke Leopold Wilhelm of Austria
Paintings of art galleries
Paintings by David Teniers the Younger
Nazi-looted art